Thomas Hatcliffe (c. 1550 – 1610) was the member of Parliament for Great Grimsby in 1597. He was a justice of the peace for Lindsey, Lincolnshire.

References 

1550s births
1610 deaths
English justices of the peace
Year of birth uncertain
English MPs 1597–1598
Members of the Parliament of England for Great Grimsby